In geometry, the elongated bicupolae are two infinite sets of polyhedra, constructed by adjoining two n-gonal cupolas to an n-gonal prism. They have 2n triangles, 4n squares, and 2 n-gon. The ortho forms have the cupola aligned, while gyro forms are counter aligned.

See also
 Bicupola
 Elongated cupola
 Gyroelongated bicupola

References
Norman W. Johnson, "Convex Solids with Regular Faces", Canadian Journal of Mathematics, 18, 1966, pages 169–200. Contains the original enumeration of the 92 solids and the conjecture that there are no others.
  The first proof that there are only 92 Johnson solids.

Polyhedra